Pi Cephei (π Cephei) is a trinary star located in the constellation Cepheus. With a combined apparent magnitude of about 4.4, the system is faintly visible to the naked eye. The inner pair of stars orbits in 1.5 years while the outer companion completes one orbit in about 160 years.

Pi Cephei was found to have a visual companion star by Otto Wilhelm von Struve in 1843. That the primary is itself a spectroscopic binary was first noticed by William Wallace Campbell in 1901 using photographic plates taken at Lick Observatory.

References

Spectroscopic binaries
Triple star systems
Cepheus (constellation)
Cephei, Pi
Cephei, 33
G-type giants
F-type main-sequence stars
A-type main-sequence stars
114222
218658
8819
Durchmusterung objects